Lloviendo Estrellas is the first extended play by Dominican-American singer Leslie Grace. It was released on June 23, 2015, under Sony Music Latin.  It is the first production released under Sony after she left her previous label Top Stop Music. She mentioned in an interview that being with the current record label, it helped her promote this album more internationally. Its lead single, "Cómo Duele El Silencio", peaked #1 in the Billboard Tropical Airplay chart.

Track listing

Charts

References

2015 debut EPs
Leslie Grace albums
Sony Music EPs
Sony Music albums
Sony Music Latin albums